The Devil Is Driving is a 1937 American drama film directed by Harry Lachman and starring Richard Dix, Joan Perry and Nana Bryant.

Partial cast
 Richard Dix as Paul Driscoll  
 Joan Perry as Eve Hammond  
 Nana Bryant as Mrs. Sanders 
 Ian Wolfe as Elias Sanders  
 Elisha Cook Jr. as Tony Stevens  
 Henry Kolker as Charles Stevens 
 Walter Kingsford as Louis Wooster 
 Ann Rutherford as Kitty Wooster  
 Frank C. Wilson as Martin Foster  
 Paul Harvey as Sam Mitchell  
 John Wray as Joe Peters

References

Bibliography
 Karen Burroughs Hannsberry. Bad Boys: The Actors of Film Noir. McFarland, 2003.

External links

1937 films
American drama films
1937 drama films
Films directed by Harry Lachman
Columbia Pictures films
American black-and-white films
Films produced by William Perlberg
1930s English-language films
1930s American films